Bloxwich is a historic market town in the Metropolitan Borough of Walsall, West Midlands, England. It is located between the towns of Walsall, Cannock, Willenhall and Brownhills.

Early history 
Bloxwich has its origins at least as early as the Anglo-Saxon period, when the place name evidence suggests it was a small Mercian settlement named after the family of Bloc (Bloxwich, earlier Blochescwic, meaning "Bloc's village").

Some 19th-century works suggest that at one time Bloxwich was a settlement in the ancient manor of Wednesbury. There is no conclusive evidence for this and Bloxwich has since at least medieval times been associated with the manor and town of Walsall (which for reasons unknown does not appear in the Domesday Book of 1086). Bloxwich itself is however mentioned in this book under the name 'Blockeswich'. Traditionally there has been a strong rivalry between Bloxwich and Walsall with origins as early as the English Civil War, when Walsall was Parliamentarian in sympathy and Bloxwich, centre of the Foreign of Walsall, was Royalist. This situation was exacerbated by disputes over local taxation for the poor rate in the 17th and 18th centuries.

18th and 19th centuries 
Bloxwich grew rapidly in the 18th century around coal mining, iron smelting and various manufacturing industries, as part of the Industrial Revolution. Manufacturing in the area consisted of bridle bits, stirrups, keys, cabinet locks, plane irons, buckle tongues, chains and saddles. Its most famous product of manufacture were awl blades, which it is reputed to have surpassed all other places in the United Kingdom in manufacturing. In the early 19th century, Bloxwich was still a village. Most of its inhabitants were employed in the newly founded mining and forging industries, as well as light metalworking.  It is also known for its canals.

20th and 21st centuries 

Bloxwich was heavily developed between the wars for council housing. Most were constructed around Blakenall Heath, as well as Harden and Goscote. In the 20 years which followed the Second World War, the Lower Farm, Beechdale and Mossley estates were also erected as council housing developments, while the southern side of Harden was developed along with the Rivers Estate at Blakenall Heath. Many privately owned houses, mostly in the Little Bloxwich area, were also constructed. In the 1990s and 2000s, many new housing developments have sprung up both in Bloxwich and at Blakenall Heath. 

Bloxwich was struck by an F1/T2 tornado on 23 November 1981, as part of the record-breaking nationwide tornado outbreak on that day. The tornado later moved out over Walsall town centre, causing further damage.

Bloxwich has in recent years completed numerous redevelopment projects. Bloxwich Police Station, opened in 1884 on Elmore Green Road, was closed for reconstruction in 2000, and reopened by Princess Anne on 26 September 2002. (It also has responsibility for Walsall, Willenhall and Darlaston.) The market square and library have also been refurbished.

Town centre
Bloxwich town centre is mostly made up of Victorian and Edwardian buildings and leafy parks and gardens, which maintain its origins as a Staffordshire town. Good built examples are Bloxwich Hospital, Bloxwich Hall, All Saints' Church and several private houses in Station Street, Stafford Road, Wolverhampton Street and Sandbank.

A 2013 report from the Townscape Heritage Research Unit at Oxford Brookes University states that, as a result of economic decline "the architectural quality of Bloxwich has been steadily eroded, with a high proportion of upper floor disuse and deteriorating/lost architectural detail, poor shop fronts and inappropriate advertising".

From the Georgian period to the 1960s, Bloxwich had more public houses than any other town in the Metropolitan Borough of Walsall, though these have begun to disappear.

Beyond Bloxwich Golf Club, Yieldfields Hall, to the north of the town on the A34 marks the northernmost edge of Bloxwich, Walsall and the West Midlands, currently in the border with Staffordshire.

Deprivation

Bloxwich is the most deprived area of Walsall, which is itself in the 10% most deprived areas of the UK. 32% of children in the north of Walsall, covering Bloxwich, Blakenall and Birchills-Leamore received free school meals in 2021. Of the four areas of Walsall, the north had the highest number of children excluded from school in 2021. Ofsted states that "Bloxwich West is an area of higher than average unemployment and lower than average academic achievement. Bloxwich East contains a more affluent community, with pockets of higher deprivation".

Bloxwich was part of the Blakenall New Deal for Communities (NDC) area. A review of heritage and conservation work carried out in Bloxwich between 2001 and 2010 under the NDC and other regeneration schemes reported a "mixed" picture of progress. Not all available funding had been used. People did feel that they were safer in the area, and school results had improved, but the sense of community in Bloxwich was weak and "Not surprisingly, people’s hopes for their future income and job prospects are not very positive ... Bloxwich remains a challenging town in terms of quality of life, and its economic prospects".

Districts
 Beechdale
 Blakenall Heath
 Dudley Fields
 Goscote
 Harden
 Leamore
 Little Bloxwich
 Lower Farm Estate
 Mossley
 Turnberry Estate
 Wallington Heath

Education

Primary schools
 Sunshine Infant School
 Blakenall Heath Junior School
 Bloxwich Academy
 Harden Primary School
 Leamore Primary School
 Busill Jones Primary School
 Mossley Primary School
 Little Bloxwich Church of England Primary School
 Elmore Green Primary School
 St Peter's Catholic Primary School
 Lower Farm Primary School
 Abbey Primary School
 All Saints National Academy (Formerly Bloxwich CofE Primary School)

Secondary schools
 Bloxwich Academy
 Walsall Academy

Defunct schools
 Black Country University Technical College
 Forest Comprehensive School
 Sneyd Comprehensive School
 T. P. Riley Comprehensive School
 R C Thomas School

Transport
Bloxwich is well-served by public transport and has two railway stations, Bloxwich and Bloxwich North.

Regular buses link Bloxwich with Walsall, whilst others link the area to the surrounding towns and cities of Wolverhampton, Bilston, Willenhall, Brownhills, Wednesfield, Cannock and Birmingham. Other local services serve nearby estates of Coalpool, Harden, Mossley, Lower Farm, Goscote, Leamore, Beechdale, Dudley Fields, Landywood, Great Wyrley, Huntington and Pelsall.

The main operator of bus services in the area is National Express West Midlands, but D&G Bus (formerly Arriva Midlands) and Diamond Bus also operate on routes in the area. Notable bus routes include:

 9 Walsall - Pelsall - Bloxwich - Wolverhampton
31 Walsall – Mossley
32 Walsall – Lower Farm
X51 Birmingham - Cannock

Roadwise, the A34, Southampton/Oxford/Manchester road, goes straight through the town and forms its High Street. Most shops are based on this linear development. The A4124 Wolverhampton to Brownhills road crosses to the north of the town. Bloxwich is four miles from the M6 motorway between junctions 10 and 11.

Notable residents

Pat Collins (1859–1943), showman and Liberal politician
Tom Major-Ball (1879–1962), music hall performer and father of former Prime Minister John Major.
Harold Parry (1896–1917), World War I poet
Maurice Wiggin (1912–1986), journalist and author
Phil Drabble (1914–2007), author and television presenter
Arthur Tolcher (1922–1987), virtuoso British harmonica player and child star
Neville "Noddy" Holder. MBE. (born 15 June 1946) Born in the Caldmore area of Walsall Noddy and his family moved to the Beechdale Estate. Former lead singer with the rock group Slade.
Rob Halford (born 1951), lead singer of seminal heavy metal band Judas Priest, who still owns a house in Walsall despite being resident in the USA.
Comedian Meera Syal (born 1961), grew up there.
Lee Naylor (born 1980), former professional footballer

References

External links 

Towns in the West Midlands (county)
Walsall